Benthalbella is a genus of pearleyes.

Species
There are currently 4 recognized species in this genus:
 Benthalbella dentata W. M. Chapman, 1939 (Northern pearleye)
 Benthalbella elongata Norman, 1937
 Benthalbella infans Zugmayer, 1911 (Zugmayer's pearleye)
 Benthalbella linguidens Mead & J. E. Böhlke, 1953 (Longfin pearleye)

References

Aulopiformes